2007 in the Philippines details events of note that happened in the Philippines in the year 2007.

Incumbents

 President: Gloria Macapagal Arroyo (Lakas-CMD)
 Vice President: Noli de Castro (Independent) 
 Senate President: Manuel Villar
 House Speaker: Jose de Venecia
 Chief Justice: Reynato Puno
 Philippine Congress:
 13th Congress of the Philippines (until June 8)
 14th Congress of the Philippines (starting July 23)

Events

January
 January 13 – 12th ASEAN Summit is held in Mandaue City.

May
  May 14 – Synchronized national and local elections are held.

June
 June 5 – The League of Cities of the Philippines files for urgent motion for issuance of writs of preliminary injunction and/or a temporary restraining order (TRO) to the Supreme Court for the pending plebiscites of the 12 municipalities: Baybay, Leyte; Catbalogan, Samar; Tandag, Surigao del Sur, Tayabas, Quezon; Tabuk, Kalinga; Bayugan, Agusan del Sur; Batac, Ilocos Norte and Guihulngan, Negros Oriental.
 June 16
 San Juan becomes a highly urbanized city in Metro Manila through ratification of Republic Act 9388 which was approved on March 11.
 Baybay becomes a city in the province of Leyte through ratification of Republic Act 9389 which was approved on March 15.
 Bogo becomes a city in the province of Cebu through ratification of Republic Act 9390 which was approved on March 15.
 Catbalogan becomes a city in the province of Samar through ratification of Republic Act 9391 which was approved on March 15.
 June 18
 Lamitan becomes a city in the province of Basilan through ratification of Republic Act 9393 which was approved on March 15.
 Mati becomes a city in the province of Davao Oriental through ratification of Republic Act 9408 which was approved on March 24.
 June 20
 Borongan becomes a city in the province of Eastern Samar through ratification of Republic Act 9394 which was approved on March 16.
 Bayugan becomes a city in the province of Agusan del Sur through ratification of Republic Act 9405 which was approved on March 23.
 June 23
 Tandag becomes a city in the province of Surigao del Sur through ratification of Republic Act 9392 which was approved on March 15.
 Tabuk becomes a city in the province of Kalinga through ratification of Republic Act 9404 which was approved on March 23.
 Batac becomes a city in the province of Ilocos Norte through ratification of Republic Act 9407 which was approved on March 24.
 June 24 – Navotas becomes a highly urbanized city in Metro Manila through ratification of Republic Act 9387 which was approved on March 10.
 June 27 – El Salvador becomes a city in the province of Misamis Oriental through ratification of Republic Act 9438 which was approved on April 12.

July
 July 1 – Carcar becomes a city in the province of Cebu through ratification of Republic Act 9436 which was approved on April 15.
 July 11 – Fourteen members of the Philippine Marines were found beheaded after an encounter against Islamic rebels in the province of Basilan.
 July 14
 Guihulngan becomes a city in the province of Negros Oriental through ratification of Republic Act 9409 which was approved on March 24.
 Tayabas becomes a city in the province of Quezon through ratification of Republic Act 9398 which was approved on March 18.
 July 27 – The Department of Agriculture declares an outbreak of hog cholera at the provinces of Pampanga and Bulacan.
 July 28 – Cabadbaran becomes a city in the province of Agusan del Norte through ratification of Republic Act 9434 which was approved on April 12.

August
 August 28 – Exiled Communist Party of the Philippines founding chairman Jose Maria Sison is arrested at Utrecht, Netherlands.

September

 September 2  – Naga becomes a city in the province of Cebu through ratification of Republic Act 9491 which was approved on July 15.
 September 12 – The Sandiganbayan convicts former president Joseph Estrada for plunder and sentence him to reclusion perpetua while acquitting him and his co-accused on other charges.

October

 October 19 – An explosion at the Glorietta mall in Makati kills 11 and injures at over a hundred.
 October 25 – Former President Joseph Estrada is pardoned and free from jail after his trial.
 October 29 – Philippines starts the barangay and Sangguniang Kabataan elections.

November
 November 13 – An explosion at the Philippine House of Representatives building in Quezon City kills four people, including Congressman Wahab Akbar.
 November 29 – The Armed Forces of the Philippines lays siege to The Peninsula Manila after soldiers led by Senator Antonio Trillanes IV stage a mutiny.

Holidays

On November 13, 2002, Republic Act No. 9177 declares Eidul Fitr as a regular holiday. The EDSA Revolution Anniversary was proclaimed since 2002 as a special non-working holiday.  Note that in the list, holidays in bold are "regular holidays" and those in italics are "nationwide special days".

 January 1 – New Year's Day
 February 25 – EDSA Revolution Anniversary
 April 5 – Maundy Thursday
 April 6 – Good Friday
 April 9 – Araw ng Kagitingan (Day of Valor)
 May 1 – Labor Day
 May 14 – Election Day
 June 12 – Independence Day
 Due to the holiday economics policy, the working holiday was on Monday, June 11. Festivities and rites were still held on June 12.
 August 21 – Ninoy Aquino Day
 August 26 – National Heroes Day
 October 12 – Eidul Fitr
 November 1 –  All Saints Day
 November 30 – Bonifacio Day
 December 25 – Christmas Day
 December 30 – Rizal Day
 December 31 – Last Day of the Year

In addition, several other places observe local holidays, such as the foundation of their town. These are also "special days."

Entertainment and culture

 March 3 – Anna Theresa Licaros is crowned as Binibining Pilipinas-Universe at the pageant held at the Araneta Coliseum.
 November 11 – Miss Earth 2007 beauty pageant is hosted by the Philippines at the University of the Philippines Theater in Quezon City. Miss Canada wins the pageant.

Sports
 February 4, Golf – Frankie Miñoza wins the 2007 Philippine Open at the Wack Wack Golf and Country Club.
 February 21, Basketball – The International Basketball Federation lifts the national team's suspension as it recognizes the new basketball federation.
 February 24, Basketball – Barangay Ginebra Kings defeated the San Miguel Beermen in the Philippine Cup Finals.
  April 15, Boxing – Manny Pacquiao knocked out Jorge Solis on the eighth round to retain the WBC International Superfeatherweight championship at the Alamodome, San Antonio, Texas.
 July 7, Boxing – In a pair of world championship bouts, Florante Condes beats IBF minimumweight champion Muhammad Rachman in a bout a Jakarta and Nonito Donaire beat the IBF flyweight champion Vic Darchinyan in Bridgeport, Connecticut, United States to become only the two current Filipino world champions.
 July 20, Basketball – The Alaska Aces defeats the Talk N Text Phone Pals to win their 12th Philippine Basketball Association championship in the 2007 PBA Fiesta Conference.
 August 11, Boxing – Gerry Peñalosa knocked out Jhonny González of Mexico to win the WBO Bantamweight Championship at the ARCO Arena, Sacramento, California.
 August 18, Baseball – Players from Makati are beaten by players from Pearl City, Hawaii to lose in the Junior League World Series at Taylor, Michigan.
 September 29, Collegiate Basketball – The De La Salle Junior Archers and the Ateneo Lady Eagles won their respective divisional championships against the Ateneo Blue Eaglets and the UP Lady Maroons.
 October 6, Boxing – Manny Pacquiao defeats Mexican Marco Antonio Barrera via unanimous decision at the Mandalay Bay Resort and Casino, Las Vegas to retain the WBC international super featherweight title.
 October 7, Collegiate Basketball – Basketball team De La Salle Green Archers sweep the UE Red Warriors 2-0 in their final series to win their seventh men's title in the UAAP.

Births
 January 13 – Ashley Sarmiento, actress
 February 12 – Esang de Torres, singer
 February 27 – Lance Lucido, actor
 April 7 – Marc Santiago, actor
 April 19 – Bimby Aquino Yap, actor
 May 10 – Jana Sitoy, artist and singer
 August 1 – Marco Masa, child actor
 September 28 – Cessa Moncera, actress
 November 14 – Kaycee David, singer
 December 9 – Zyren Dela Cruz, actor

Deaths

 January 13 – Gido Babilonia, basketball player (b. 1966)
 January 15 – Pura Santillan-Castrence, writer and diplomat (b. 1905)
 January 16 – Jainal Antel Sali, Jr., Abu Sayyaf leader (b. 1964)
 January 16 – Lee Aguinaldo, abstract painter (b. 1933)
 January 24 – Jose R. Velasco, physiologist and National Scientist (b. 1916)
 February 18 – Vicente Ericta, retired Supreme Court Associate Justice (b. 1915)
 February 19 – Antonio Serapio, Congressman from Valenzuela City (b. 1937)
 March 16 – Joey Gosiengfiao, film director (b. 1941)
 March 17 – Antonio M. Martinez, retired Supreme Court Associate Justice (b. 1929)
 March 24 – Jun Bernardino, former Philippine Basketball Association commissioner (b. 1947)
 April 3 – Gloria T. Aragon, first woman director of PGH (b. 1918)
 April 7 – Ogie Juliano, theater director (b. 1961)
 April 13:
 Salvador J. Valdez, Jr., retired Court of Appeals Justice (b. 1936)
 Nicanor Yñiguez, last Speaker of the Regular Batasang Pambansa during Marcos administration (b. 1915)
 April 28 – Julian Resuello, former San Carlos, Pangasinan mayor (b. 1952)
 May 17 – Cesar "Kuya Cesar" Nucum, radio broadcaster (b. 1938)
 May 18 – Yoyoy Villame, singer and comedian (b. 1938)
 June 2 – Paulo Campos, physician and National Scientist (b. 1921)
 June 16 – Leonardo Perez, former Senator and COMELEC Chairman (b.1925)
 July 13 – Fredegusto "F.G." David, psychologist (b. 1938)
 July 17 – Geronimo Velasco, Minister of Energy during Marcos administration (b. 1927)
 July 21 – Jesus Sison, Press Secretary during Ramos administration (b. 1931)
 August 9 – Pete Roa, television host (b. 1940)
 August 27 – Ramon Zamora, actor (b. 1935)
 August 29 – Nenita Cortes-Daluz, radio journalist and politician (b. 1939)
 September 29 – Alex Catedrilla, singer (Ikakasal ka na) (b. 1956)
 October 24 – Mita Pardo de Tavera, former DSWD Secretary during Aquino administration (b. 1920)
 November 8 – Dulce Quintans-Saguisag, former DSWD Secretary during Estrada administration and wife of ex-Senator Rene Saguisag (b. 1943)
 November 13 – Wahab Akbar, Congressman from Basilan (b. 1960)
 November 15 – Emoy Gorgonia, former TV host Tukaan (b. 1962)
 November 16 – Ross Rival a.k.a. Rosauro Salvador, action film actor and father of actress Maja Salvador (b. 1945)
 November 18 – Sedfrey Ordoñez, former Secretary of Justice during Aquino administration (b. 1921)
 December 5 – Rene Villanueva, creator and head writer of Batibot (b. 1954)
 December 15 – Ace Vergel, film actor (b. 1952)
 December 16 – Ernest Santiago, fashion designer (b. 1939)
 December 22 – Adrian Cristobal, writer and columnist (b. 1932)

References

 
2007 in Southeast Asia
Philippines
2000s in the Philippines
Years of the 21st century in the Philippines